Events from the year 1967 in Scotland.

Incumbents 

 Secretary of State for Scotland and Keeper of the Great Seal – Willie Ross

Law officers 
 Lord Advocate – Gordon Stott; then Henry Wilson
 Solicitor General for Scotland – Henry Wilson; then Ewan Stewart

Judiciary 
 Lord President of the Court of Session and Lord Justice General – Lord Clyde
 Lord Justice Clerk – Lord Grant
 Chairman of the Scottish Land Court – Lord Birsay

Events 
 7 February – Mortonhall Crematorium, Edinburgh, designed by Spence, Glover & Ferguson (project architect: John 'Archie' Dewar), is dedicated.
 9 March – Glasgow Pollok by-election: Conservatives take the seat from Labour despite a fall in support as the Scottish National Party gains 28% of the vote.
 26 March – closure of Machrihanish Coalfield.
 April–June – the Scottish Region of British Railways withdraws its last steam locomotives.
 28 April – Third Lanark A.C. plays its last football match.
 25 May – Celtic F.C. become the first British and Northern European team to reach a European Cup final and also to win it, beating Inter Milan 2-1 in normal time with the winning goal being scored by Steve Chalmers in Lisbon, Portugal.
 27 May – closure of the last route served by trolleybuses in Glasgow.
 9 September – an underground fire at Michael Colliery in East Wemyss in the Fife Coalfield kills 9; more than 300 escape but the mine is closed.
 20 September – the Queen Elizabeth 2, the largest ship ever built in Scotland and the last passenger ship built on the Clyde, is launched at John Brown & Company's yard at Clydebank.
 2 November – Hamilton by-election: Winnie Ewing wins for the Scottish National Party, taking the seat from Labour.
 13 November – University of Stirling chartered.
 20 December – Scott Lithgow formed to merge the Clyde shipbuilding interests of Scotts Shipbuilding and Engineering Company and Lithgows.
 Deepwater pier on Coll opened.
 Workers Party of Scotland (Marxist–Leninist) formed.
 Scottish Civic Trust formed to promote protection and enhancement of the built environment.
 Kagyu Samye Ling Monastery and Tibetan Centre established in Eskdalemuir.

Births 
 January – King Creosote (Kenny Anderson), singer-songwriter
 21 February – Neil Oliver, archaeologist and television presenter
 11 March – John Barrowman, actor
 8 June – Kathryn Imrie, golfer
 15 August – Tony Hand, ice hockey player
 23 August – Jim Murphy, Labour politician
 26 August – Michael Gove, Conservative politician
 26 October – Douglas Alexander, Labour politician
 29 December – Carl Honoré, writer on current affairs
 Martin Boyce, sculptor
 Graeme Macrae Burnet, novelist
 Nathan Coley, installation artist

Deaths 
 3 January – Mary Garden, operatic soprano (born 1874)
 23 March – Duncan Macrae, actor (born 1905)
 3 August – Thomas Haining Gillespie, founder of the Royal Zoological Society of Scotland and Edinburgh Zoo (born 1876)
 13 August – Dòmhnall Ruadh Chorùna, poet (born 1887)
 6 September – Alex Moffat, miner, trade unionist and communist activist (born 1904)
 Annie Maxton, Independent Labour politician

The Arts
 George Mackay Brown's first book of stories, A Calendar of Love, published

See also 
 1967 in Northern Ireland

References 

 
Scotland
Years of the 20th century in Scotland
1960s in Scotland